Mark Keil and Jeff Tarango were the defending champions but only Tarango competed that year with David Ekerot.

Ekerot and Tarango won in the final 7–6, 7–6 against David Adams and Menno Oosting.

Seeds
Champion seeds are indicated in bold text while text in italics indicates the round in which those seeds were eliminated.

 Libor Pimek /  Byron Talbot (semifinals)
 David Adams /  Menno Oosting (final)
n/a
 David Ekerot /  Jeff Tarango (champions)

Draw

External links
 1996 Open Romania Doubles draw

1996 Doubles
Doubles
1996 in Romanian tennis